This is a list parks in the province of Antwerp.

Antwerp

Antwerp
Tourist attractions in Antwerp
Antwerp
Antwerp
Antwerp parks